Lawrence Edward Hart Jr. (born September 19, 1976) is a former American football tight end who played for the Arizona Cardinals of the National Football League (NFL). He played college football at Southern University.

References 

1976 births
Living people
American football tight ends
Southern Jaguars football players
Orlando Rage players
Arizona Cardinals players